Die zärtlichen Verwandten (The Tender Kinsfolk, The Tender Relatives) is a 1930 German comedy film directed by Richard Oswald and starring Harald Paulsen, Charlotte Ander, and Felix Bressart. The film's art direction was overseen by Franz Schroedter.

Cast
 Harald Paulsen as Herr Linsemann 
 Charlotte Ander as Frau Linsemann 
 Felix Bressart as Uncle Emil 
 Ralph Arthur Roberts as Uncle Adolf 
 Paul Henckels as Herr Weber 
 Emmy Wyda as Frau Weber 
 Gustl Gstettenbaur as Weber's son
 Harry Nestor as Cousin Wilhelm 
 Lotte Lorring as Wilhelm's wife
 Hans Hermann Schaufuß as Herr Stempel 
 Adele Sandrock as Frau Stempel 
 Wilhelm Bendow as Uhl, a musician
 Camilla von Hollay as a child-minder
 Kurt Lilien as the factotum 
 Willy Rosen as a singer

References

Bibliography
 Kasten, Jürgen & Loacker, Armin. Richard Oswald: Kino zwischen Spektakel, Aufklärung und Unterhaltung. Verlag Filmarchiv Austria, 2005.

External links

1930 films
1930 comedy films
German comedy films
Films of the Weimar Republic
1930s German-language films
Films directed by Richard Oswald
German black-and-white films
1930s German films